This is a list of scientific journals in materials science.

 ACS Applied Materials & Interfaces
 Acta Crystallographica
 Acta Materialia
 Acta Metallurgica
 Scripta Materialia
 Advanced Composite Materials
 Advanced Materials
 Advanced Energy Materials
 Advanced Engineering Materials
 Advanced Functional Materials
 Advanced Optical Materials
 Annual Review of Materials Research
 APL Materials
 Bulletin of Materials Science
 Carbon
 Chemistry of Materials
 Computational Materials Science
 Crystal Growth & Design
 Functional Materials
 Functional Materials Letters
International Journal of Damage Mechanics
 Journal of the American Ceramic Society
 Journal of Applied Crystallography
 Journal of Colloid and Interface Science
 Journal of Composite Materials
 Journal of Crystal Growth
 Journal of Elastomers and Plastics
 Journal of Electronic Materials
 Journal of the European Ceramic Society
 Journal of Materials Chemistry - A, B, and C
 Journal of Materials Research
 Journal of Materials Research and Technology
 Journal of Materials Science
 Journal of Materials Science Letters
 Journal of Materials Science: Materials in Electronics
 Journal of Materials Science: Materials in Medicine
 Journal of Nuclear Materials
 Journal of Physical Chemistry B
 Macromolecular Chemistry and Physics
 Macromolecular Materials and Engineering
 Macromolecular Rapid Communications
 Macromolecular Reaction Engineering
 Macromolecular Theory and Simulations
 Materials
 Materials and Structures
 Materials Chemistry and Physics
 Materials Horizons
 Materials Research Letters
 Materials Science and Engineering - A, B, C, and R
 Materials Today
 Applied Materials Today
 Materials Today Chemistry
 Materials Today Energy
 Materials Today Physics
 Materials Today Nano
 Materials Today Sustainability
 Materials Today Communications
 Materials Today: Proceedings
 Metallurgical and Materials Transactions
 Metamaterials
 Modelling and Simulation in Materials Science and Engineering
 MRS Advances
 MRS Bulletin
 MRS Communications
 MRS Energy & Sustainability
 Nature Materials
 Nature Reviews Materials
 Physical Review B
 Progress in Materials Science
 Progress in Polymer Science
 Science and Technology of Advanced Materials
 Sensors and Materials
 Structural and Multidisciplinary Optimization
 Synthetic Metals

Biomaterials 

 Acta Biomaterialia
 Biofabrication
 Biomacromolecules
 Biomaterials
 Dental Materials
 Journal of Bioactive and Compatible Polymers
 Journal of Biomaterials Applications
 Journal of Biomedical Materials Research
 Macromolecular Bioscience

Nanomaterials 

 ACS Nano
 Applied Nanoscience
 Beilstein Journal of Nanotechnology
 Nano
 Nano Research
 Nano Today
 Nanoscale
 Nature Nanotechnology
 Nano Letters
 Nanoscale Horizon
 Nano Energy
 Small
 Small Methods

See also 

 List of scientific journals
 List of fluid mechanics journals
 List of physics journals

Materials science journals